Arthur Breisky (May 14, 1885, Roudnice nad Labem near Prague – 1910, New York City, United States) was a Czech writer of Decadence.

He was a novelist, a translator, literary editor, and a playwright; wrote a number of reviews on modern literature and art. Was also known as a dandy and aesthetician, and a master of mystification both in his literary works and in real life.

Died as a lift boy, probably committed an error.

Born in Roudnice, Arthur started his education in Prague but moved with the family to Louny in 1899. Nowadays, there is a street in Louny named after Arthur Breisky.

Outline of works

Best known books:

 Triumf zla (The Triumph of Evil) (1910)
 Dvě novely (Two stories) (1927)

Essays and critical reviews:

 Střepy zrcadel (Shattered Mirrors) (1928)

His correspondence and unpublished papers from 1902–1910 have been gathered and later published as a book V království chimér (In the Kingdom of Chimeras).

See also 
 Czech literature

External links
Details of his work, biography 
 Selected bibliography from the Faculty of Philosophy and Arts, Charles University, Prague 
Naked Masks: Arthur Breisky or How To Be a Czech Decadent_1 
Arthur Breisky and Oscar Wilde: Criticism, Mask, Mystification

1885 births
1910 deaths
Czech male writers
Austro-Hungarian emigrants to the United States